The We Were There books are a series of historical novels written for children.  The series consists of 36 titles, first released between 1955 and 1963 by Grosset & Dunlap.  Each book in the series is a fictional retelling of an historical event, featuring one or more children as primary characters.  The books were written by a number of different authors, each writing from one to seven of the books; the authors included Benjamin Appel, Jim Kjelgaard, Earl Schenck Miers, William O. Steele, and others.  Each book's byline also lists a separate "historical consultant", who was a specialist in the historic topic covered by that particular book.  The historical consultants were typically college professors or, in the case of war-related stories, retired military officers; among the more noteworthy consultants for the series were the historians Bruce Catton, Walter Prescott Webb and A. B. Guthrie, Jr.  The books are illustrated with black-and-white line art, with color drawings on the dust jacket.

The dust jackets of the original printings of the books describe the series as follows:

We Were There books are easy to read and provide exciting, entertaining stories, based upon true historic events.  Each story is checked for factual accuracy by an outstanding authority on this particular phase of our history.  Though written simply enough for young readers, they make interesting reading for boys and girls well into their teens.

The original hardbound editions of the books were followed by several other printings, including editions for book clubs and libraries.  The books were later reissued with hardbound picture covers (using the original dust jacket artwork), and softcover editions of some books became available in the 1970s.  Three of the books are available from Lamppost Publishers and American Home School Publishers.

List of We Were There titles

References

Series of books
Series of children's books
Children's historical novels
1950s children's books
1960s children's books